The 1894–95 City Cup was the inaugural edition of the City Cup, a cup competition in Irish football.

The tournament was won by Linfield for the first time.

Group standings

References

1894–95 in Irish association football